Sári Szász (married name Kolozsvári), (1922 – February 19, 2006) was a female international table tennis player.

Table tennis career
From 1950 to 1955 she won ten medals in singles, doubles, and team events in the World Table Tennis Championships.

The ten World Championship medals included four gold medals in the team event for Romania.

See also
 List of table tennis players
 List of World Table Tennis Championships medalists

References

1922 births
2006 deaths
Romanian female table tennis players